The 2012 Milwaukee mayoral election was held on Tuesday, April 3, 2012, to elect the mayor for Milwaukee.  Incumbent mayor Tom Barrett was elected to a third term, defeating Edward McDonald.  This election coincided with other municipal elections, including an unopposed re-election bid for Milwaukee County Executive Chris Abele and contested elections for City Comptroller, City Treasurer, and the Common Council.

Municipal elections in Wisconsin are non-partisan.  The non-partisan primary was held on Tuesday, February 21, 2012, to narrow the field of candidates to two.

Primary election

Candidates
 Tom Barrett, incumbent mayor
 Ieshuh Griffin, community activist and frequent candidate
 Edward McDonald, faculty member of the University of Wisconsin–Extension and community activist

Declined
 Bill Wenz, former real estate broker

Results

General election

Candidates
 Tom Barrett, incumbent mayor
 Edward McDonald, faculty member of the University of Wisconsin–Extension and community activist

Results

Barrett announced on March 30, 2012 that he will run in the Democratic primary for Governor in the recall election to face incumbent Scott Walker and subsequently lost.

References

2012 Wisconsin elections
Milwaukee
2012
Government of Milwaukee